Coventry is the primary village and a census-designated place (CDP) in the town of Coventry, Orleans County, Vermont, United States. As of the 2020 census, it had a population of 111, out of 1,100 in the entire town of Coventry.

The CDP is in north-central Orleans County, along the southern edge of the town of Coventry. It is bordered to the south by the town of Irasburg. U.S. Route 5 runs along the eastern edge of the community, leading north  to Newport and southeast the same distance to Orleans. Vermont Route 14 follows US 5 along the eastern edge of Coventry, but leads north  to Newport Center and south  to Irasburg.

The Black River flows northward along the western edge of the village; it continues north to enter Lake Memphremagog at Newport.

References 

Populated places in Orleans County, Vermont
Census-designated places in Orleans County, Vermont
Census-designated places in Vermont